Zhanna Zhumaliyeva ( / ) is a Kazakhstani model and beauty pageant titleholder who won Miss Kazakhstan 2010 on September 19, 2010, in Almaty, Kazakhstan.

Miss Kazakhstan 2010
She also won the Top Model award.

Miss World 2011

References

External links

Living people
Kazakhstani beauty pageant winners
Miss World 2011 delegates
1987 births
Miss Kazakhstan winners